Panipaali is a Malayalam rap song written and composed by Malayalam film actor Neeraj Madhav. The music production of the song was done by Anand "Arcado" Seetharaman. Music was mastered by Ribin Richard and additional sound design was done by Vignesh R.K. (Sapthaa Records).

Pani Paali 2 

Pani Paali 2 is the second part of Pani Paali Music Video. Pani Paali 2 released in 20 November 2021 in YouTube channel of Neeraj Madhav.

References

External links 
 
 

2020 songs
2020 singles